The 2006 Russia–Georgia energy crisis describes an international incident triggered by two explosions on the Mozdok–Tbilisi natural gas pipeline in North Ossetia on January 22, 2006. The explosions suspended gas supply to Georgia at a time when the weather was particularly cold, leading to allegations of deliberate energy blackmail carried out by the Russian government.

Background

The explosions took place with the backdrop of the 2006 Russia-Ukraine gas crisis that same month. They also coincided with sabotage on electricity lines just several miles from the pipeline, which descended large parts of Georgia into darkness. Due to these suspicious coincidences, Georgia accused Russia of conducting deliberate acts of sabotage with the aim of forcing the nation into surrendering its pipelines to Gazprom – the Russian state-owned monopoly.

Russia dismisses the accusations, claiming the charges could be set by terrorists. The pipelines were eventually fixed.

See also

References

North Ossetia pipeline explosions
Energy crises
Energy policy of Russia
Explosions in 2006
Explosions in Russia
Georgia (country)–Russia relations